Elena Maksimova (born 6 May 1988), née Klimets, also Maksimova-Klimets, is a Belarusian chess player and journalist who holds the title of Woman FIDE Master (WFM, 2005).

Biography
In 2000s Elena Maksimova was one of the leading Belarusian chess players. Elena Maksimova played for Belarus in the Women's Chess Olympiad:
 In 2008, at first reserve board in the 38th Chess Olympiad (women) in Dresden (+2, =3, −1).

In 2010, she graduated from Maxim Tank Belarusian State Pedagogical University Physics and Mathematics Department with master's degree. From 2011 Elena Maksimova lives in Moscow and worked as journalist from Russian chess portals chess-news.ru and chesspro.ru.

References

External links

1988 births
Living people
Chess players from Minsk
Belarusian female chess players
Chess Woman FIDE Masters
Chess Olympiad competitors
Chess writers